Amine Karam (born 3 January 1984) is a French footballer.

Career

England
Cleared to compete for Oxford United on the last day of the 2005 clearance deadline, Karam debuted in the Oxfordshire Senior Cup quarter-final with the reserves, showing good touches as they knocked out Carterton Town 2–0. However, despite settling on a one-month contract, he had limited first team opportunities and was gone that summer.

At Oxford United, Karam made two appearances in the Football League Two, against Notts County and Swansea City, and scored zero goals.

Reunion
Arriving at Saint-Pauloise over the month of February 2006, the Frenchman debuted during a defeat to AS Excelsior, supplying an assist to Romain Tossem to brush past Seychelles' St Michel United 1–0.

Morocco
An addition to CR Al Hoceima in January 2011, the winger stated that recent good results portended a better showing for the club during the second half of 2010/11, but they ended up finished 12th.
He also claimed that the Moroccan top division had potential and was good for individual skills.

References

External links 
 at Footballdatabase.eu 
 at Soccerway

Oxford United F.C. players
Vannes OC players
Aviron Bayonnais FC players
Association football midfielders
1984 births
FC Serrières players
Expatriate footballers in England
Expatriate footballers in the Netherlands
Living people
Expatriate footballers in Morocco
French footballers
FC Sochaux-Montbéliard players
Chabab Rif Al Hoceima players
Association football wingers
French expatriate footballers
Yverdon-Sport FC players
Expatriate footballers in Switzerland
Expatriate footballers in Réunion
French sportspeople of Moroccan descent
Association football forwards